The persecution of Germans based on their ethnicity has occurred at various points throughout history. 

These instances have been due to either one of two reasons:  

1. The German populations which were persecuted in the areas where they lived were believed, either correctly or incorrectly, to be linked with German nationalist regimes  (e.g. Imperial Germany or Nazi Germany) 

2. The German people were seen as foreigners who were lacking property in the countries in which they resided. 

Two examples of the first case are the World War I era persecution of Germans in the United States and the persecution of Germans in Eastern and Central Europe following the end of World War II in Europe. While many of the victims of these persecutions did not have any connection to those German nationalist regimes, German minority organizations cooperated with the Nazi regime, a notable example of this cooperation was engaged in by the Selbstschutz organizations. This fact was used as a justification for hostility against Germans who were directly involved in these organizations, as well as Germans who were not involved in them. After World War II, many Germans were killed or driven from their homes in acts of vengeance by the Allied Powers. They were also killed or driven from their homes as a part of campaigns of ethnic cleansing. In other cases (e.g. in the case of the German-speaking populations of Poland, Estonia, or the Transylvanian (Siebenbürgen), the German minority in Romania and the Balkans), communities with no connection to the Third Reich were also persecuted.

Examples of this persecution include the persecution of ethnic German Mennonite, Amish, and Hutterite communities in the United States and the persecution of Tyrolean Germans in the province of South Tyrol. In South Tyrol, these hostilities hit the historically German population of an Austrian territory that had been annexed by Italy after World War I.  

Additionally, the debate over the persecution of Germans sometimes encompasses the treatment of citizens of German descent in countries such as the United Kingdom, the United States, Canada, and Australia during World War I and World War II.

By country

Australia
During World War I, ethnic Germans in Australia faced similar persecution as they did in the United States. Many were interned for the duration of the war and faced hostility from their fellow citizens. To avoid persecution and/or to demonstrate their commitment to their new home, many Germans changed their names to anglicized or Francophone variants.

Canada
In Canada, thousands of German-born Canadians were interned in detention camps during World War I and World War II and subjected to forced labor. During World War II, 711 German-born Jewish refugees were interned at Camp B/70. The camp was in operation from 1940-1945 in Ripples, New Brunswick and held both Third Reich prisoners of war and refugees. After a year of internment, refugees were seen as valuable to the war effort and given the option to participate in the war or find sponsorship in Canada.

Czechoslovakia

A few days after the end World War II, 2,000 Germans were massacred in Postoloprty and Zatec by the Czechoslovakian army.

In the summer of 1945, there were a number of incidents and localized massacres of the German population.

The following examples are described in a study done by the European University Institute in Florence:

 In the Přerov incident, 71 men, 120 women, and 74 children were killed.
 30,000 Germans were forced to leave their homes in Brno for labour camps near Austria.  It is estimated that several hundred died in the death march.
 Estimates of killed in the Ústí massacre range from 30 - 50 to 600 - 700 civilians. Some women and children were thrown off the bridge into the Elbe River and shot.

Law No. 115 of 1946 (see Beneš decrees) provides: "Any act committed between September 30, 1938, and October 28, 1945, the object of which was to aid the struggle for liberty of the Czechs and Slovaks or which represented just reprisals for actions of the occupation forces and their accomplices, is not illegal, even when such acts may otherwise be punishable by law."

As a consequence, all atrocities committed during the expulsion of Germans were made legal, and since the law is still in effect no perpetrator has ever faced charges for his or her crimes during the expulsion.

Italy

After the end of World War I, the southern part of Tyrol with a German-speaking population was incorporated into Italy's new borders.  Following the rise of the Fascist movement under Benito Mussolini, the ethnic Germans of this enclave faced growing persecution. Their names, and the names of the towns and places in the area, were forcibly changed to Italian.  In addition, Mussolini engaged in a campaign to resettle ethnic Italians into the region.  Many Tyroleans fled to Germany during this time, and the situation in this province became a source of friction between Hitler and Mussolini.

After the end of World War II, the organized persecution of Germans in South Tyrol came to an end, although ethnic strife continued for decades.

Norway
The children of Norwegian mothers and German soldiers were persecuted after the war, see War children.

German POWs in Norway were forced to clear their own minefields and then walk over them, leading to the death and mutilation of hundreds of prisoners.

Poland

Soviet Union

As a result of the German invasion of the Soviet Union on June 22, 1941, Stalin decided to deport the German Russians into internal exile and forced labor in Siberia and Central Asia. It is evident that, at this point, the regime considered national minorities with ethnic ties to foreign states, such as Germans, potential fifth columnists. On August 12, 1941, the Central Committee of the Communist Party decreed the expulsion of the Volga Germans, allegedly for treasonous activity, from their autonomous republic. On September 7, 1941, the Volga German Autonomous Soviet Socialist Republic was abolished and about 438,000 Volga Germans were deported. In subsequent months, an additional 400,000 ethnic Germans were deported to the Gulag in Siberia and Central Asia from their other traditional settlements such as Ukraine and Crimea. (It is very difficult to establish precise numbers from Soviet sources). 

The Soviets were not successful in expelling all German settlers living in the Western and Southern Ukraine, however, due to the rapid advance of the Wehrmacht (German army). The secret police, the NKVD, was able to deport only 35% of the ethnic Germans in Ukraine. Thus in 1943, the Nazi German census registered 313,000 ethnic Germans living in the occupied territories of the Soviet Union. With the Soviet re-conquest, the Wehrmacht evacuated about 300,000 German Russians and brought them back to the Reich. Because of the provisions of the Yalta Agreement, all former Soviet citizens living in Germany at the war’s end had to be repatriated, most by force. More than 200,000 German Russians were deported, against their will, by the Western Allies and sent to the Gulag.  Thus, shortly after the end of the war, more than one million ethnic Germans from Russia were in special settlements and labor camps in Siberia and Central Asia. It is estimated that 200,000 to 300,000 died of starvation, lack of shelter, overwork and disease during the 1940s.

In the dying days of World War II and during the occupation of Germany, Soviet forces invaded German villages and raped German women en masse. It is believed by historian Antony Beevor that "a 'high proportion' of at least 15 million women who lived in the Soviet zone or were expelled from Germany's eastern provinces were raped." Several thousand women committed suicide. On the final day of hostilities, 900 women in one village just east of Berlin took their children and drowned them in the river (followed by their own suicides) as soon as they heard the Russian guns coming. In all, only about 4,000 Soviet soldiers were ever punished for atrocities. (See also Soviet war crimes)

United Kingdom
Germans were demonized in the press well before World War I, e.g. when the Kaiserliche Marine started to challenge the Royal Navy, but particularly around 1912 and during World War I. The anti-German sentiment was so intense that the British Royal Family was advised by the government to change its name (which was of German origin), resulting in the House of Saxe-Coburg-Gotha becoming the House of Windsor. Kaiser Wilhelm II of Germany was a grandson of Queen Victoria of the United Kingdom and the nephew of King Edward VII of the United Kingdom.

United States
During the 18th and 19th centuries, German-Americans were among the most common non-Anglophone group in the United States.  Numerous incidents of hostility against these groups took place during the 19th century but were largely non-systematic. 

A source of particular tension was the presence of Pacifist Mennonite and Amish communities, who spoke (continue to do so today) a dialect of German called Pennsylvania Dutch.  Although most Germans were not Mennonites, this reinforced the popular view that Germans did not consider themselves part of America.

The portrayal of Germany as "The Hun" in British pro-war propaganda inflamed existing tensions. The situation came to a crisis with America's entry into the war in 1917. Anti-German rioting was widespread. Many German-language periodicals, which had numbered in the hundreds, ceased operation (many were destroyed).  These towns were primarily in the Midwestern region of the United States. Many German-Americans translated their names or altered them to resemble English names (a trend which had begun in the 19th century, e.g. Gustave Whitehead). By the time the U.S. troops returned from Europe, the German community had ceased to be a major force in American culture, or was no longer perceived as German (see Groucho Marx). 

Largely for this reason, although some persecution of ethnic Germans did occur during World War II, it was not widespread. Most of the German-American population no longer identified themselves as German, nor were they identified with the Nazis in the popular mind.  Despite this, the US government interned as dangerous nearly 11,000 persons of German ancestry.  Only enemy aliens were supposed to be interned, but family members, many of them American citizens, often joined them in the camps.

See also
 Flight and expulsion of Germans (1944–1950)
 World War II evacuation and expulsion
 Expulsion of Germans from Romania after World War II
 German diaspora

References

External links
NY Times book review of Other Losses by historian Stephen Ambrose
History News Network Bacque and Fisher respond to Ambrose
Totenbuch der Donauschwaben History of Communist Yugoslavian persecution and genocide of ethnic German minority and collection of names of the missing and dead.
de Zayas Homepage Alfred-Maurice de Zayas, Professor and author who has studied the German expulsions and persecutions extensively and written books on the topic.
A Legacy of Dead German Children Ten thousand German children under five died in Danish camps
Danish Study Says German Children Abused
A modest proposal, Time magazine, 1941
Morgenthau's Hope, Time magazine 1945

Sudetenland
German diaspora
Ethnic cleansing of Germans
Civil detention in the United States
Anti-German sentiment
Propaganda in the United Kingdom